Öhringen Hauptbahnhof is a station on the Hohenlohe Railway in Öhringen in the German state of Baden-Württemberg.  The station is classified by Deutsche Bahn as a category 5 station. The station is part of the zone of the KreisVerkehr Schwäbisch Hall (transport district of Schwäbisch Hall) and is the largest and most important station of the Hohenlohe district.

History
The station was opened in 1862 and was formerly called Öhringen station. At the timetable change in December 2008 it was renamed Öhringen Hauptbahnhof.

Rolling stock
Regional-Express trains on the Heilbronn–Crailsheim route are mainly operated with diesel multiple units of classes 642 (Siemens Desiro) and 628. Once a day a Regional-Express service runs from Heilbronn to Öhringen, composed of double-deck coaches hauled by a class 146 (TRAXX) locomotive. As the Heilbronn–Öhringen-Cappel section of the Hohenlohe Railway is electrified, the operation of trains stopping at all stations trains is divided into two sections: the Heilbronn–Öhringen-Cappel section is operated with Karlsruhe Stadtbahn electric multiple units of class GT8-100D/2S-M. This line is operated by the Heilbronn Stadtbahn. On the Öhringen Hbf–Schwäbisch Hall-Hessental section diesel multiple units of classes 642 and 628 are used.

Rail services

Notes

Railway stations in Baden-Württemberg
Railway stations in Germany opened in 1862
19th-century establishments in Württemberg